Bijoygarh is a neighbourhood located of the southern part of Kolkata, in West Bengal, India. The neighbourhood shares its boundary with Jadavpur, Baghajatin, Bikramgarh, Regent Estate and Ranikuthi ,

Although It Is Merged With Kolkata, It Still Partially Remain Under The South 24 Parganas Jurisdiction.

It Has 3 Schools, 1 College And 3 Health Care Centre. Bijoygarh State General Hospital Is The 5th Largest Hospital In The South 24 Parganas District.  It Also Falls Under District Magistrates, South 24 Parganas .

This Area Is Served By Jadavpur Police Station Of Kolkata police And Patuli Women Police Station .

Bijoygarh Was Merged With The City Of Kolkata Along With Bapuji Nagar, Golf Green, Dhakuria, Selimpur, Garia on 23 July 2013 .

Bijoygarh Area Has Been Considered Busy Area By Kolkata Police And It Is Very Close To Garia and Rajpur-Sonarpur Which Is Also A City In South 24 Parganas

References

Neighbourhoods in Kolkata